Rebecka Törnqvist (born 26 April 1964 in Uppsala, Sweden) is a Swedish jazz and pop vocalist.

Her debut album A Night like This was released in 1993 and sold over 100,000 copies. This was followed by Good Thing in 1995.

Most of the albums by Rebecka Törnqvist are sung in English, with the exception of Vad jag vill (2001). She helped to increase "interest in young female jazz vocalists in Sweden in the 1990s, though her solo albums weren't pure jazz, but rather pop with heavy jazz influences".

Discography
 1993 - A Night Like This
 1995 - Good Thing
 1996 - Stockholm Kaza Session (featuring Per 'Texas' Johansson)
 1998 - Tremble My Heart
 1999 - Gloria with the band Gloria
 2001 - Vad Jag Vill ("What I Want")
 2003 - People Like You and Me with the band Gloria
 2004 - Travel Like in Songs
 2006 - Melting into Orange
 2006 - Fire in the Hole – Sara Isaksson & Rebecca Törnqvist Sing Steely Dan
 2008 - The Cherry Blossom and the Skyline Rising from the Street
 2011 - Scorpions

References

External links
 Official Rebecka Törnqvist Homepage
 Swedish Fan Page

1964 births
Living people
Musicians from Uppsala
Swedish jazz singers
Swedish women singers
English-language singers from Sweden